Alexey Dmitrievich Perelet (14 January 1914 – 11 May 1953) was a Soviet pilot who was the principal test pilot for  military aircraft prototypes produced by Tupolev during World War II. Perelet was born in the village of Voronki, then part of the Russian Empire and started his test pilot career in 1943, working for the Tupolev aerospace and defense company. He tested and flew the following planes: Tu-4, Tu-10, Tu-16, Tu-77, Tu-82, Tu-85 and Tu-95. He died on 11 May 1953 in a crash while testing the Tu-95/1 prototype plane with 2TV-2F engines.

References

1914 births
1953 deaths
Aviators killed in aviation accidents or incidents
People from Poltava Oblast
Heroes of the Soviet Union
Soviet aviators
Soviet test pilots
Recipients of the Order of Lenin
Recipients of the Order of the Red Banner
Lenin Prize winners
Victims of aviation accidents or incidents in 1953
Victims of aviation accidents or incidents in the Soviet Union